Pratap Chandra Memorial Homoeopathic Hospital & College (PCMHHC) is the Homoeopathic medical college and hospital in Kolkata, West Bengal.  The college was established in  1926 by the late Dr. Jitendra Nath Majumder, in order to commemorate the name of his illustrious father, the late Dr. Pratap Chandra Majumder, who was one of the pioneers of Homoeopathy in India and popularised Homoeopathy in West Bengal. It is the second oldest Homeopathic Institution in India as well Asia.

Affiliation
The college is affiliated to the West Bengal University of Health Sciences and is recognized by the Central Council of Homoeopathy (CCH) and AYUSH under the Ministry of Health and Family Welfare, Govt. of India and is recognized by the Govt. of West Bengal.

Equipment
The college is equipped with laboratories, library, anatomy dissection hall and 24-hour emergency services. Special facilities like x-ray, ECG, ultrasonography, eye, dental, ENT, physiotherapy units are provided. Also the college department is now equipped with computer in order to import education to Repertory.

Professional BHMS( Bachelor of Homoeopathic Medicine And Surgery) Degree Colleges
The other 12 BHMS colleges are: 
Bengal Homoeopathic Medical College and Hospital, Asansol
Birbhum Vivekananda Homoeopathic Medical College & Hospital
Burdwan Homoeopathic Medical College & Hospital
D.N. De Homoeopathic Medical College & Hospital, Kolkata
Kharagpur Homoeopathic Medical College and Hospital
Mahesh Bhattacharya Homoeopathic Medical College and Hospital, Howrah
Metropolitan Homoeopathic Medical College & Hospital, Kolkata
Midnapore Homoeopathic Medical College and Hospital
National Institute of Homoeopathy, Kolkata
Netai Charan Chakravarty Homoeopathic Medical College & Hospital, Howrah
Purulia Homoeopathic Medical College & Hospital
The Calcutta Homoeopathic Medical College & Hospital, Kolkata

See also

References

Pratap Chandra Memorial Homoeopathic Hospital & College

External links
Satellite View of the College
MedIndia
www.thewbuhs.org
www.pcmhhc.org
www.indiastudychannel.com

1926 establishments in India
Affiliates of West Bengal University of Health Sciences
Educational institutions established in 1926
Universities and colleges in Kolkata
Hospitals established in 1926
Homoeopathic Medical Colleges in West Bengal